Dhatki (धाटकी; ڍاٽڪي), also known as Dhatti (धाटी; ڍاٽي) or Thari (थारी; ٿَري), is one of the Rajasthani languages of the Indo-Aryan branch of the Indo-European language family. Dhatki is closely related to Sindhi and Marwari both.

Speakers

Dhatki/Dhati  has two major dialects Jaisalmeri and the other one spoken in tharparker, Jaisalmeri is spoken in western parts of Jaisalmer and Barmer districts & Southern part of Jalore district of Rajasthan, India and other in eastern parts of Sindh, Pakistan. Some Dhatki-speaking communities migrated to India in 1947 after the independence and continued to do so in small numbers after that date, but the great majority of Dhatki speakers still reside in Pakistan.
Dhatki/Dhati is spoken by these communities:
 The Tharis
 Kunbhar
 Thari Maheshwaris
 Rajputs
 Rajpurohit
 Charan
 Sodha
 Khatri
 Malhi
 Suthar
 Bajeer
 Sonara
 Meghwal
 Behil
 Harijan
 Garasiya

The majority speakers of Dhatki language live in Umerkot District and Tharparkar District in Sindh, Pakistan. 60% of the language's speakers are Muslims, 35% are Hindu and the remaining 5% practice traditional folk religions.

Phonology
Dhatki has implosive consonants, unlike other closely related Rajasthani languages but like the neighbouring (but more distantly related) Sindhi language. It is likely that these consonants developed in the language from contact with more culturally dominant Sindhi speakers. Aside from this, its phonology is much like other Indo-Aryan languages:

Notes
 Marginal and non-universal phonemes are in parentheses.  is lateral  for some speakers (Masica 1991:98).
  is post-velar.

Dhakti has a fairly standard set of vowels for an Indo-Aryan language: [ə aː ɪ iː ʊ (sometimes: u) uː eː oː ɛː ɔː]. The vowel ʊ may be realized as a short u and the vowel ɪ may be realized as a short i. The vowel ɛː is often realized as the diphthong əiː based and context or as an æː based on the speaker's accent. The vowel ɔː is often realized as the diphthong əuː based and context. Nazalized vowels occur word finally in Dhakti, they are: [ĩː ẽː ɛ̃ː ɑ̃ː ɔ̃ː õː ũː].

Samples
A few of the typical sentences in Dhatki are:
  "What are you doing?",  "I am reading this Page.",
  "What is your name?",
  "I have to eat" (Literally translates to "I have to eat roti).
  "where are you going?  "Nowhere.",
  "How are you?".   "I am Fine",
{Tu Kun aheen?}-"who are you?"

Writing System
The language uses two major writing systems. In India, the Devanagari script (which is also used for Marwari, Hindi and many other north Indian languages) is employed; whereas is in Pakistan, the Sindhi script is used. Some mercantile families, particularly on the Indian side of the border use their own scripts, usually variations of the Mahajani script.

References

Languages of Rajasthan
Languages of Sindh